William Malcolm McLean (28 February 1918 – 9 December 1996) was an Australian soldier and a state and national representative rugby union player who captained the Wallabies in five Test matches immediately after World War II.

Pre-war rugby
Like their father, Doug McLean, Sr., Bill's older brother Doug, Jr. had represented for Australia in both rugby codes before Bill left school. Bill too was a promising sportsman – goalkeeper in the 1938 Queensland Water Polo Team and rowing in Surf Boat crews winning the Queensland state championship in 1938.  He pursued a rugby career and in 1938 played with the GPS club in Brisbane and made his representative debut with state selection the following year. From there he was selected for the ill-fated 1939 Wallaby tour to England captained by Vay Wilson. The team docked at Southampton on the day when England declared war and after a couple of weeks spent filling sandbags to start the war effort, the squad set sail for Australia having not played a game. Of the unlucky tourists only McLean, Keith Windon and Len Smith would return to footballing success after the war.

Military service
McLean enlisted in the AIF in July 1940. He was a Captain in the 2/3rd Australian Commando Squadron and saw action against the Japanese in Borneo after parachuting in behind enemy lines. He was discharged in February 1946.

Post-war rugby
After the war McLean was selected in and captained an Australia XV versus The Rest trial match. His opposing captain was his tour teammate Keith Windon and when The Rest won the game, McLean was picked as tour captain for the first post-war Wallaby tour of New Zealand. Injured in the trial McLean missed the first six tour matches but played and captained the Wallabies in the two Tests against the All Blacks and the Test against the New Zealand Maori. The following year he again met the All Blacks when they visited Australia. He captained once against them and played in both Tests, the second as captain.

He was pitted against the urbane Phil Hardcastle for the national captaincy honours in 1947. Hardcastle was a medical doctor who got on well with all but didn't lead from the front as was the confrontational style of McLean. McLean again led The Rest in a selection bout against an Australian XV, won the match and was confirmed again as the seventh Queenslander to lead Australia. The nine-month tour involved a circumnavigation of the globe and leadership of a mixture of battle hardened war veterans and young rugby stars. It was a singular honour on one of the world's great sporting tours. For McLean a return to the British Isles was in some ways a completion of unfinished business from 1939 and an opportunity to play on Twickenham's hallowed turf as his father and brother had before.

The tour was only six matches old when McLean fulfilled his dream of playing at Twickenham in a minor clash against Combined Services. The match was near completion when he was hit by three tacklers from different angles. Writers Howell, Tressider and Shehadie (all present on the tour) each described the snap of bone breaking being audible to onlookers. McLean suffered a serious spiral fracture of the tibia and fibula. He played no further games on the tour and had now played his last representative match for Australia. The tour captaincy passed at that moment to the 21-year-old vice-captain Trevor Allan. McLean played for Queensland again in 1951 and 1952, also coaching both the Queensland and the Australian national side in those years.

Rugby lineage
In addition to his father and brother's status as Dual-code rugby internationals, his brother Jack McLean was a Wallaby of 1946, as were later Bill's son Peter McLean and Bill's nephews Jeff and Paul McLean. Paul McLean would later be the Chairman of the Australian Rugby Union for a number of years up till 2008. See McLean Family (rugby footballers).

References

Sources
 The Spirit of Rugby (1995) (Collection of Essays) HarperCollins, Australia – (Essay specific to this article Phil Tressider's The Class of '47–48 1st published Sydney's Daily Telegraph 1987)
 Howell, Max (2005) Born to Lead – Wallaby Test Captains, Celebrity Books, Auckland NZ
 Shehadie, Nicholas (2003) A Life Worth Living, Simon & Schuster Australia

1918 births
1996 deaths
Australian rugby union players
Australia international rugby union players
Australian rugby union captains
Australian Army personnel of World War II
People educated at Brisbane State High School
Place of death missing
Bill
Australian Army officers
Rugby union players from Ipswich, Queensland
Rugby union flankers